Art equity is a proportionate ownership right that an individual or entity may claim against a physical representation of Art. Art Equity is distributed through organizations like the International art exchange.

Art equity has many legal rights and any ownership stake is transferable pending the owner's permission.

Property law legal terminology
Equity (law)